The 2010 BRC IMPCO V8 Supercars GP Challenge was the fourth meeting of the 2010 V8 Supercar season, however it was a stand-alone event not contributing to the 2010 V8 Supercar Championship Series pointscore. It was held on the weekend of 25 to 28 March at Albert Park Street Circuit, in the inner suburbs of Melbourne, the capital of Victoria. It was the lead support category for the 2010 Australian Grand Prix.

This race meeting was broadcast by Network Ten; the only race the network is permitted to broadcast following its loss of broadcasting rights to the V8 Supercars in 2006.

Qualifying 
Qualifying was held on Thursday 25 March.

Top Ten shootout 
The top ten shootout was held on Friday 26 March.

Race 1 
Race 1 was held on Friday 26 March.

Race 2 
Race 2 was held on Saturday 27 March.

Race 3 
Race 3 was held on Sunday 28 March.

Results
Results as follows:

Qualifying
Qualifying timesheets:

Race 1
Race timesheets:

Race 2
Race timesheets:

Race 3
Race timesheets:

Points
Race timesheets:

See also
2010 Australian Grand Prix

References

External links
Official site for Australian Grand Prix
Official site for V8 Supercar
Official timing and results

BRC IMPCO V8 Supercars GP Challenge